Vedadri is a village in NTR district of the Indian state of Andhra Pradesh. It is located in Jaggayyapeta mandal of Vijayawada revenue division. It is one of the villages in the mandal to be a part of Andhra Pradesh Capital Region. The village is one of the religious destination for Hindus, with the Vedadri Narasimha Temple on the banks of River Krishna.

References 

Villages in NTR district